Reece Christopher Hutchinson (born 14 April 2000) is an English professional footballer who plays as a defender for Sligo Rovers, on loan from Cheltenham Town.

Playing career
Hutchinson came through the Academy at Burton Albion and said it was a "dream come true" to feature against Aston Villa – the club he supported as a boy – in a 2018–19 pre-season friendly, having previously made the substitute bench in an EFL Championship fixture with Derby County in April 2018. Prior to that, he had signed his first professional contract with the "Brewers" in May 2018 following a successful loan spell at Northern Premier League Division One South side Romulus. He made his debut under manager Nigel Clough in the English Football League on 11 August 2018, coming on as a substitute for Damien McCrory 17 minutes into a 3–1 defeat at Gillingham. He made his first start in EFL League One on 1 September, in a 3–0 victory over AFC Wimbledon at Pirelli Stadium.

On 12 May 2021 it was announced that he would be one of 12 players leaving Burton at the end of the season.

On 11 January 2022, Hutchinson signed a short term deal with Cheltenham Town until the end of the season.

On 2 February 2023, Hutchinson signed for League of Ireland Premier Division club Sligo Rovers on loan until the end of June. He scored the first goal of his senior career on 6 March 2023 when he opened the scoring in a 2–1 win at home to St Patrick's Athletic.

Statistics

References

2000 births
Living people
Footballers from Birmingham, West Midlands
English footballers
Association football fullbacks
Burton Albion F.C. players
Romulus F.C. players
Cheltenham Town F.C. players
Sligo Rovers F.C. players
English Football League players
Northern Premier League players
League of Ireland players
Expatriate association footballers in the Republic of Ireland